The Southern Volcanic Plain is an interim Australian bioregion located in western Victoria and south-eastern South Australia. The Southern Volcanic Plain bioregion is part of the Southeast Australia temperate forests ecoregion. The Natural Temperate Grassland of the Victorian Volcanic Plain lies on the plain.

Subregions
The Southern Plains bioregion consists of two subregions:

 Victorian Volcanic Plain (SVP01) – 
 Mount Gambier (SVP02) –

References

Biogeography of South Australia
Biogeography of Victoria (Australia)
IBRA regions
Southeast Australia temperate forests